Banksia candolleana, commonly known as the propeller banksia, is a species of shrub that is endemic to Western Australia. It has shiny green, deeply serrated leaves with triangular lobes and spikes of golden yellow flowers on short side branches.

Description
The leaves are shiny green with deep triangular lobes on the margins.

Taxonomy
Banksia candolleana was first formally described in 1855 by the Swiss botanist Carl Meissner in William Jackson Hooker's Journal of Botany and Kew Garden Miscellany from specimens collected by James Drummond. The specific epithet honours Meissner's countryman Augustin Pyramus de Candolle.

In 1891, Otto Kuntze, in his Revisio Generum Plantarum, rejected the generic name Banksia L.f., on the grounds that the name Banksia had previously been published in 1776 as Banksia J.R.Forst & G.Forst, referring to the genus now known as Pimelea. Kuntze proposed Sirmuellera as an alternative, referring to this species as Sirmuellera candolleana. This application of the principle of priority was largely ignored by Kuntze's contemporaries, and Banksia L.f. was formally conserved and Sirmuellera rejected in 1940.

Distribution and habitat

Ecology
Banksia candolleana regenerates from a woody lignotuber after bushfire. Some large shrubs have been estimated at 1,000 years old. The white-tailed dunnart (Sminthopsis granulipes) has been recorded visiting flowerheads, though whether it is an effective pollinator is unknown. Ants and bees, including the European honeybee, have been recorded visiting flower spikes.

Use in horticulture
Banksia candolleana is slow growing in cultivation and may take up to 10 years to flower from seed. It grows readily in well-drained soils in Mediterranean climates, but does not do well in climates of higher humidity on the east coast of Australia. Seeds do not require any treatment, and take 22 to 35 days to germinate.

References

candolleana
Endemic flora of Western Australia
Eudicots of Western Australia
Plants described in 1855
Taxa named by Carl Meissner